Gabriella Izzo (born August 5, 2001) is an American figure skater. She is the 2019 CS Asian Open Trophy bronze medalist, the 2019 Egna Spring Trophy champion, and the 2021 U.S. International Figure Skating Classic bronze medalist. She is also the 2019 U.S. junior national champion.

Personal life 
Izzo was born August 5, 2001, in Greenbrae, California. After graduating from Boston Latin School in 2019, she began her studies at Harvard University in 2020.

Career

Early years 
Izzo began learning to skate when she was eight or nine years old. Her junior international debut came in February 2018 at the International Challenge Cup in the Netherlands, where she placed 4th.

2018–19 season 
Izzo made her ISU Junior Grand Prix (JGP) debut in autumn 2018, placing 6th in Canada and 9th in Slovenia. In January, she won the junior ladies title at the 2019 U.S. Championships in Detroit, Michigan. In March, making her senior international debut, she won gold at the Egna Spring Trophy in Italy.

2019–20 season 
Beginning her season on the JGP series, Izzo placed 8th in Croatia and 9th in Latvia. In November, she won bronze at a senior international, the 2019 CS Asian Open Figure Skating Trophy in China.

In January, making her senior national debut, she finished 9th at the 2020 U.S. Championships in Greensboro, North Carolina. Following the event, she underwent surgery for a torn labrum in her left shoulder. Due to the operation and pandemic-related rink closures, she was off the ice from around mid-January to June.

2020–21 season 
Izzo was invited to her first senior Grand Prix competition, the 2020 Skate America, but withdrew before the event. She placed 9th at the 2021 U.S. Championships. She was coached by Mark Mitchell and Peter Johansson until the end of the season.

2021–22 season 
Izzo decided to train under Aleksey Letov and Olga Ganicheva at the Skating Club of Boston. In September, she won bronze at the U.S. International Figure Skating Classic. Given two Challenger assignments, Izzo finished thirteenth at the 2021 CS Warsaw Cup and fourth at the 2021 CS Golden Spin of Zagreb.

At the 2022 U.S. Championships, Izzo was seventh after the short program, but a fourth-place free skate elevated her to the pewter medal position overall. This placement earned her an assignment to the 2022 Four Continents Championships in Tallinn, where she came eighth.

2022–23 season 
Izzo withdrew from the 2022 CS U.S. Classic in advance, instead making her season debut at the 2022 CS Budapest Trophy, where she finished in eighth place. She was then invited to make her senior Grand Prix debut at the 2022 MK John Wilson Trophy, where she came seventh.

Programs

Competitive highlights
GP: Grand Prix; CS: Challenger Series; JGP: Junior Grand Prix. Pewter medals (4th place) awarded only at U.S. national, sectional, and regional events.

Detailed results

Senior results

Junior results

Notes

References

External links 
 

2001 births
Living people
American female single skaters
People from Greenbrae, California
21st-century American women